Tremblay en France Handball is a handball club from Tremblay-en-France, France, that plays in the LNH Division 2.

Crest, colours, supporters

Naming history

Kits

Team

Current squad 

Squad for the 2021–22 season

Technical staff
 Head Coach:  Dragan Zovko

Previous squads

Former club members

Notable former players

  Patrice Annonay (2016–2021)
  Arnaud Bingo (2007–2016, 2021-)
  Sébastien Bosquet (2013–2015)
  Samuel Honrubia (2016-2019)
  Dika Mem (2015-2016)
  Sébastien Mongin (2008–2012)
  Sébastien Ostertag (2005-2012)
  Erwan Siakam-Kadji (2016-2021)
  Audräy Tuzolana (2012–2016)
  Semir Zuzo (2006-2011)
  Yacinn Bouakaz (2005–2010)
  Sassi Boultif (2017-2019)
  Micke Brasseleur (2011–2015)
  Ahmed Hadjali (2005-2006)
  Salim Nedjel (2004-2005)
  Felipe Borges (2018-2020)
  Bruno Butorac (2019–2021)
  Luka Šebetić (2017–2021)
  Aurélien Tchitombi (2011–2013)
  Barna Putics (2014–2016)
  Petar Angelov (2005-2009)
  Vasko Ševaljević (2017-2019)
  Luc Steins (2017-2019)
  Pedro Portela (2018-2021)
  Marius Sadoveac (2016–2018)
  Alexander Pyshkin (2016–2017)
  Uroš Bundalo (2014-2016)
  Aljoša Rezar (2014-2016)
  Juan del Arco (2019–2020)
  Mladen Bojinović (2015-2017)
  Dragan Počuča (2009-2013)
  Rastko Stefanovič (2005-2011)
  Oussama Boughanmi (2013-2015)
  Wissem Bousnina (2006-2010)
  Marouan Chouiref (2013-2015, 2018-)
  Makrem Missaoui (2005-2007)
  Mohamed Soussi (2020-)

Former coaches

References

External links
  
 

French handball clubs
Sport in Seine-Saint-Denis